Ryoji Fukui (福井 諒司, born August 7, 1987) is a Japanese football player.

Club statistics
Updated to end of 2018 season.

References

External links
Profile at Mito HollyHock

1987 births
Living people
Fukuoka University alumni
Association football people from Hyōgo Prefecture
Japanese footballers
J1 League players
J2 League players
Tokyo Verdy players
Giravanz Kitakyushu players
Kashiwa Reysol players
Renofa Yamaguchi FC players
Mito HollyHock players
FC Ryukyu players
Association football defenders